Let's Get Ready is a non-profit organization that provides low-income high school students with free SAT preparation, admissions counseling and other support services needed to gain admission to and graduate from college. Programs are based at colleges, staffed by college student volunteers. Let's Get Ready is the largest network of student-run college access programs in the U.S., serving approximately 2,500 U.S. high school students per year.

History
Started in 1998 by a group of college-age students in Westchester, NY the organization grew from a local program to Harvard University. In 2000, the College Board gave LGR money to replicate their program in NYC schools. In 2007, Goldman Sachs gave the New England LGR programs $400,000 to help expand programs.  This money accounted for one-third of the budget for these programs. , LGR ran 40 programs throughout the Northeast. The program has a partnership with Teach for America. It has expanded to serve teenagers from north-central Maine at Colby College to Pennsylvania at Temple University.

The Let's Get Ready Model
LGR runs afterschool programs that prepare students for college and tutor them for the SATs. The course is open to high school juniors and seniors (grade 11 - 12 in USA).

LGR program managers recruit  college students to serve as paid site directors.  New site directors are chosen for each site each semester, although there is room for continuity.  Site Directors recruit talented college coaches and eager high school students, typically working with a site partner, which may be a community center (for example, LGR works with the Goddard Riverside Center), a college program (for example, LGR works extensively with the CUNY Black Male Initiative), or a high school (for example, LGR runs a program that sends Columbia University students to Frederick Douglass Academy).  LGR then provides training to the college coaches and support to site directors, and the program begins.
Each high school student receives 39 hours of SAT preparation lessons, including practice tests, and 15 hours of college guidance.  Students and coaches often develop powerful bonds, and many coaches return year after year.

Over 90% of LGR program graduates go directly to college after high school.

Programs

Fall and Spring
 Barnard College
 Bates College
 Boston College
 Bowdoin College
 Clark University
 Columbia University
 Dartmouth College
 Fairfield University
 Harvard University
 Mount Holyoke College
 New York University
 University of Pennsylvania
 Temple University
 Tufts University
 Vassar College
 Wellesley College
 Wesleyan University
 Macaulay Honors College

Spring
 Baruch College
 Colgate University
 Cornell University
 Hamilton College
 Princeton University
 Temple University
 Upper Darby High School

Summer

Boston, MA
Bridgeport, CT
Brockton, MA
Bronx, NY
Brooklyn, NY
Cambridge, MA
Dorchester, MA
Harlem, NY
Hartford, CT
Lawrence, MA
Manhattan, NY
Mount Vernon, NY
New Haven, CT
New Rochelle, NY
New York City
Norwalk, CT

Philadelphia, PA
Queens, NY
Stamford, CT
Summit, NJ
Upper Darby, PA
White Plains, NY
Worcester, MA
Providence, RI

See also
 College Board
 SAT
 College admissions in the United States

References

Non-profit organizations based in New York City
Educational charities based in the United States